The men's 110 metres hurdles event at the 1993 Summer Universiade was held at the UB Stadium in Buffalo, United States on 16, 17 and 18 July 1993.

Medalists

Results

Heats
Wind:Heat 1: ? m/s, Heat 2: ? m/s, Heat 3: +1.9 m/s, Heat 4: +3.9 m/s

Semifinals
Wind:Heat 1: +1.9 m/s. Heat 2: +2.4 m/s

Final
Wind: +1.9 m/s

References

Athletics at the 1993 Summer Universiade
1993